Peter Phyll (born 4 February 1974) is a Montserratian international football player who plays as a defender for Ideal SC in the Montserrat Championship.

Career
He has played for Ideal the whole of his career and who the Montserrat Championship with them in 2004.

Personal life
He has a brother, Kurt Phyll, who also plays for Ideal SC.

International career
Phyll has represented Montserrat on three occasions.

References

1974 births
Living people
Montserratian footballers
Montserrat international footballers
Ideal SC players
Association football defenders